Battili is a town in Bhamini Mandal of Parvathipuram Manyam district in Andhra Pradesh, India.

Population 
Battili is a large village located in Bhamini of Parvathipuram Manyam district, Andhra Pradesh with total 1695 families residing. The Battili village has population of 7264 of which 3556 are males while 3708 are females as per Population Census 2011.

In Battili village population of children with age 0-6 is 743 which makes up 10.23% of total population of village. Average Sex Ratio of Battili village is 1043 which is higher than Andhra Pradesh state average of 993. Child Sex Ratio for the Battili as per census is 1147, higher than Andhra Pradesh average of 939.

Battili village has lower literacy rate compared to Andhra Pradesh. In 2011, literacy rate of Battili village was 63.17% compared to 67.02% of Andhra Pradesh. In Battili Male literacy stands at 72.90% while female literacy rate was 53.73%.

As per constitution of India and Panchyati Raaj Act, Battili village is administrated by Sarpanch (Head of Village) who is elected representative of village.

Geography
Battili village is sharing border Andhra Pradesh and Odisha. Nearest village From Andhra Pradesh is Katragada, From odisha is Singubai and Jaganathapur.

Adjacent village Vamasadara river is flowing. This is the village in Andhra Pradesh where vamasadara enters.

Culture
This village is located at border of two states due to this most of the people follow the mixed culture of Andhra and Odisha. village is famous Santoshi Mata temple which located in bus station. Every Friday lot of other village and near by people visit temple for Darshain, pooja, Ujjapana.Every year 10 days before Holi Santoshi Mata Jatara will performed.

Village also having Church and Mosque.

Transport
Battili village had Bus Facility from Srikakulam, Palakonda, Visakhapatanam, Bhimavaram, Parvatipuram and Raygada. From Srikakulam bus station bus will available for every one hour until 8PM.

Nearest Railway station is Gunupur(GNPR) it was 18 km away from battili located in Odisha. But only few train are available to this station, Nearest biggest Railway station Srikakulam Road located in Amadalavalasa

Facilities
village having APGVB bank, Post Office, SRMT, BMPS, Publics water supply, Logistic supply from Srikakulam, Amazon and Flipkart will delivery to this village.

Major Crop
Paddy, cotton, tamarind, turmeric

Education
Primary and secondary school education is imparted by government and private schools of the School Education Department of the state. The mediums of instruction followed by schools are English, Telugu and Odia(oriya).

References 

Villages in Parvathipuram Manyam district